Bydalsfjellet is a mountain in Oscar II Land at Spitsbergen, Svalbard. It has an altitude of 867 metres, and is located on the ridge of Jämtlandryggen, between Svenskane and Frösöfjellet.

References

Mountains of Spitsbergen